Penelope Ying-Yen Wong (born 5 November 1968) is an Australian politician who has been Minister for Foreign Affairs and Leader of the Government in the Senate in the Albanese Government since 2022. A member of the Australian Labor Party (ALP), she has been a Senator for South Australia since 2002. Wong previously served as Minister for Climate Change and Minister for Finance and Deregulation during the governments of Kevin Rudd and Julia Gillard from 2007 until 2013.

Born in Malaysia to a Chinese Malaysian father and a British Australian mother, Wong was educated at Scotch College in Adelaide, before attending the University of Adelaide, graduating with Bachelor of Arts and Bachelor of Laws degrees. Prior to beginning her political career, she worked as a lawyer and political advisor. Wong entered politics by winning a Senate seat in the 2001 election. 

Following Labor's victory in the 2007 election, she was appointed Minister for Climate Change, going on to lead for Australia at the landmark 2009 UN Climate Change Conference in Copenhagen. Following the 2010 election, Wong was moved to become Minister for Finance and Deregulation, and in June 2013, she was elected by her colleagues to become Leader of the Government in the Senate. Following Labor's defeat in the 2013 election, Wong held several roles in the Shadow Cabinets of both Bill Shorten and Anthony Albanese, serving as Leader of the Opposition in the Senate throughout. Upon Labor's victory at the 2022 election, Wong was appointed Minister for Foreign Affairs, and resumed her role as Leader of the Government in the Senate.

Wong has been described by her biographer as "principled, intellectual, private, restrained and sane". In 2008, she became the first Asian-Australian in an Australian Cabinet. She was also the first female openly-LGBTI Australian federal parliamentarian, and was an instrumental figure in the legalisation of same-sex marriage in Australia in 2017, reversing her previous endorsement of Labor Party policy that had opposed it.

Early life 
Wong was born on 5 November 1968 in Kota Kinabalu, the capital of Sabah, which had become part of the Federation of Malaysia five years earlier. Her parents were Jane (née Chapman), an English Australian whose forebears first reached South Australia on Cygnet in 1836, and Francis Wong, a Malaysian Chinese man of Hakka origin who lived in Sandakan during the Japanese occupation of British Borneo. Penny Wong's parents had met in the early 1960s, when Francis Wong was studying architecture at the University of Adelaide under the Colombo Plan. Wong grew up speaking dialects of Malay (Bahasa Melayu), Chinese (likely Hakka Chinese), and English. At five years old, she began attending Kinabalu International School. After her parents separated, she moved to Adelaide, South Australia, at the age of eight with her mother and younger brother.

Education and student politics
After starting at Coromandel Valley Primary School, Wong gained a scholarship to Scotch College, Adelaide, where she studied chemistry, physics and mathematics. During her time at Scotch College, Wong toured New Caledonia as part of her French language studies, performed in school productions of plays such as Six Characters in Search of an Author, and co-captained the hockey team. She was accepted into the Bachelor of Medicine, Bachelor of Surgery at the University of Adelaide, but after spending a year on exchange in Brazil, found she had an aversion to blood. She then studied and graduated with a Bachelor of Arts in Jurisprudence and a Bachelor of Laws with Honours at the University of Adelaide, and completed a Graduate Diploma of Legal Practice at the University of South Australia.

Through her friendship with David Penberthy, who had also been on exchange in Latin America, Wong joined the Socialist Workers Party-sponsored Committee in Solidarity with Central America and the Caribbean (CISCAC) while at university in 1987, but was not an active member. Wong's connections with CISCAC brought her in contact with a broader group of left-wing activists who opposed the Hawke Labor government's planned changes to university fees. In a July 1988 election, Wong won a position on the board of the Adelaide University Union as part of the newly-formed Progressive Education Team. One month later, while protesting outside a state Labor Party convention at the Adelaide Trades Hall, Wong had a conversation with Young Labor member Lois Boswell, who told her that "if you wanted to really make a difference, you had to be inside the room having that battle." Wong joined the Labor Party that day; she credits her decision to her conversation with Boswell, and the Liberal-National Coalition's new "One Australia" policy opposing multiculturalism and Asian immigration.

Wong became involved with the leadership of the Adelaide University Labor Club, and has been a delegate to the South Australian Labor Party State Convention every year since 1989 (with the exception of 1995). She also worked part-time for the Construction, Forestry, Mining and Energy Union (CFMEU), and won a position on the National Executive of the National Union of Students. A number of her contemporaries at university went on to become Australian politicians; former senator for South Australia, Natasha Stott Despoja, former Premier of South Australia Jay Weatherill and health minister Mark Butler, were contemporaries.

Professional career
Wong graduated from the University of South Australia in 1992, and continued her association with the CFMEU as an industrial officer. She was admitted to the South Australian Bar in 1993. During 1995 and 1996, Wong acted as an advisor to the CFMEU and to the newly elected New South Wales state government, specializing in the area of forest policy in the middle of the fierce 1990s environmental battles over logging in NSW.

On returning to Adelaide, Wong began practising  law, working as a solicitor at the firm Duncan and Hannon (1996–1999). From 1999 to 2002, she worked as a legal officer with the Liquor, Hospitality and Miscellaneous Union. During this time she also won a position on the ALP's state executive.

During her legal career (1996–2002), Wong appeared as counsel in 11 published decisions of the Australian Industrial Relations Commission, 15 published decisions of the South Australian Industrial Relations Court, 8 published decisions of the South Australian Industrial Relations Commission, 3 published decisions of the South Australian Workers Compensation Appeal Tribunal and 10 published decisions of the South Australian Workers Compensation Tribunal.

Political career

Election to the Senate 

Wong ran for pre-selection for the Senate in 2001, and was selected for the top position on the Labor Party's South Australian ticket. She was elected at the 2001 election, her term commencing on 1 July 2002. Wong is a member of Labor Left, and is a member of EMILY's List Australia, the support network for Labor women, and sat on a number of Senate committees, primarily those related to economics.

In June 2005, Wong was appointed Shadow Minister for Employment and Workforce Participation, and Shadow Minister for Corporate Governance and Responsibility. Following the reshuffle in December 2006, she became responsible for the portfolios of Public Administration and Accountability, Corporate Governance and Responsibility, and Workforce Participation.

First Rudd Government (2007–2013)

In December 2007, in the wake of the Labor Party victory in the 2007 election, Wong was appointed to the Cabinet of Australia in the first Rudd government as the Minister for Climate Change, the first person to hold this role in an Australian Cabinet. She accompanied then Prime Minister Kevin Rudd to Bali for the international climate change talks. Wong led final negotiations as Chair of the United Nations Working Group in the closing days of the United Nations Climate Change Conference in December 2007, shortly after her appointment as minister.

Gillard and Second Rudd Governments (2010–2013)
Shortly after the commencement of the Gillard government in June 2010, Julia Gillard promoted Wong to succeed Lindsay Tanner as Minister for Finance and Deregulation. At this time, Wong said she agreed with the Labor Party policy on marriage because there was a, "cultural, religious and historical view of marriage being between a man and a woman".

In February 2013, Wong was elected as the ALP's deputy Senate leader following the resignation of Chris Evans, thus becoming Deputy Leader of the Government in the Senate. Wong retained the position of Minister for Finance after Kevin Rudd's successful leadership spill in June 2013. Following Stephen Conroy's resignation and the beginning of the second Rudd government, she also became the Leader of the Government in the Senate. She was the first woman to be elected as ALP Senate leader, and the first woman to serve as Leader of the Government in the Senate. Wong held these roles until Labor's defeat at the 2013 federal election.

Opposition (2013–2022)
Following Labor's defeat at the 2013 Australian federal election, Wong was elected Leader of the Opposition in the Senate, becoming the first woman to hold the position. She was also appointed Labor's foreign affairs spokesperson. In this role, she helped negotiate Australia's interests in the Trans-Pacific Partnership which was ratified in late 2018. In March 2019, Wong was named the 2018 McKinnon Political Leader of the Year.

Following the 2019 Labor leadership contest, Wong retained her positions as Leader of the Opposition in the Senate and Shadow Minister for Foreign Affairs in the new cabinet of Anthony Albanese. At this point she was named part of Albanese's four-person ALP leadership team, along with Richard Marles and Kristina Keneally.

In March 2022, Wong was named Australia's most trusted politician in a study by Roy Morgan Research.

Albanese Government (2022–present)

With Labor winning government in the 2022 Australian federal election, Wong became Minister for Foreign Affairs. She was sworn in on 23 May 2022, only two days after the election and before final results were known, in order to attend a pre-scheduled meeting of the Quadrilateral Security Dialogue with newly elected Prime Minister Anthony Albanese. Wong is the first Asian Australian and the first openly LGBTI person to hold the office of Australian Foreign Minister. Within a few days of being sworn into office, Wong visited several Pacific countries to emphasise the new government's approach to climate change and relations with nations in the region, including Fiji (where she addressed the Pacific Islands Forum), Samoa, and Tonga.

On 16 June, Wong visited New Zealand Foreign Minister Nanaia Mahuta to reaffirm bilateral relations and cooperation in the areas of climate change, indigenous, and Indo-Pacific issues. Wong also stated that her government would consider New Zealand's concerns about Australia's Section 501 deportation policy, which had strained relations between the two countries.

During a 2023 Senate estimates hearing, Wong was asked about the presence of nuclear weapons aboard nuclear-capable B-52s and B2 Sprits U.S. bombers, which operate regularly out of northern Australia. When U.S. bombers visit Australia, the U.S. government does not tell the Australian government whether the aircraft are carrying nuclear weapons. Wong said the Australian Government "understand[s] and respect[s] the longstanding US policy of neither confirming or denying". She also said the government wanted a greater U.S. military presence in the Indo-Pacific region.

Personal life 
Wong is a practising Christian, attending Pilgrim Uniting Church in Adelaide. She has said that, "I do not ever remember having the sense that I denied the existence of God." Others in her wider family from Sabah are Buddhist. She held Malaysian citizenship before renouncing it in 2001.

Wong is a lesbian and came out publicly a month after she assumed her Senate seat in 2002. In 2010, Wong was selected by readers of Samesame website as one of the 25 most influential lesbian Australians. 

Wong's partner, Sophie Allouache, is a public servant and former University of Adelaide Students' Association president. In December 2011, Allouache gave birth to their first child, after announcing the IVF-assisted pregnancy using donor sperm in August 2011. Allouache gave birth to their second daughter in 2015, at the Adelaide Women's and Children's Hospital.

See also
 First Rudd ministry
 First Gillard ministry
 Second Gillard ministry
 Second Rudd ministry
 Albanese ministry

References

External links

 Parliamentary Profile: Labor website
 
 Summary of parliamentary voting for Senator Penny Wong on TheyVoteForYou.org.au

 

1968 births
Living people
20th-century Australian lawyers
20th-century Australian women
21st-century Australian lawyers
21st-century Australian politicians
21st-century Australian women politicians
Adelaide Law School alumni
Australian barristers
Australian Christians
Australian Labor Party members of the Parliament of Australia
Australian ministers for Foreign Affairs
Australian politicians of Chinese descent
Female finance ministers
Female foreign ministers
Government ministers of Australia
Gillard Government
Labor Left politicians
Lawyers from Adelaide
Lesbian politicians
LGBT Christians
LGBT Protestants
Malaysian LGBT people
LGBT legislators in Australia
Australian LGBT rights activists
Malaysian emigrants to Australia
Members of the Australian Senate 
Members of the Australian Senate for South Australia
Members of the Cabinet of Australia
People educated at Scotch College, Adelaide
People from Sabah
People who lost Malaysian citizenship
Rudd Government
Uniting Church in Australia people
Women members of the Australian Senate
Women government ministers of Australia
Albanese Government
University of South Australia alumni